M. Jane Brady  (born January 11, 1951) is an American attorney and former judge. She was the Attorney General of Delaware from 1995 to 2005, the first woman to serve in that position.  From 2005 to 2017, she served as a judge on the Delaware Superior Court.

Education 
Brady earned her undergraduate degree from University of Delaware and a JD degree from Villanova University School of Law.

Career
Brady became an attorney in 1977. She then proceeded to serve as a prosecutor for twelve years, followed by four years of private law practice, and an unsuccessful attempt to be elected to the United States Senate seat then held by future president Joe Biden. In 1994 she was elected Delaware's first female attorney general, as a Republican. She was re-elected in 1998 and 2002.

She resigned as attorney general in December 2005, and became a judge on the Delaware Superior Court.

Brady is supporter of former president Donald Trump, defeated by Biden in the 2020 presidential election. In the aftermath of the storming of the Capitol by a mob of Trump supporters, Brady claimed that Trump bore no responsibility for the riot and opposed efforts to remove him from office. Brady has also claimed that election "irregularities" occurred in the 2020 election due to mail-in voting.

Personal life 
Brady is married to Michael Neal and has an adopted son, Trent.

Awards 
 Alumni Wall of Fame, University of Delaware (1996)

See also

 List of people from Delaware
 List of female state attorneys general in the United States
 1990 United States Senate election in Delaware

References

External links 
 M. Jane Brady at ballotpedia.org
 The Honorable M. Jane Brady, Judge
 

|-

|-

20th-century births
20th-century American lawyers
21st-century American lawyers
American women judges
Delaware Attorneys General
Delaware Republicans
Delaware Superior Court judges
Living people
Women in Delaware politics
1951 births
State political party chairs of Delaware
20th-century American women lawyers
21st-century American women lawyers